The Worcester Spy, originally known as the Massachusetts Spy was a newspaper founded in 1770 in Boston, Massachusetts by Isaiah Thomas, dedicated to supporting the Revolutionary cause against the British.  In the 19th century, it became an organ for abolitionist sentiment.

History

In 1775, under threat from "Boston Tories", Thomas removed the newspaper's presses to Worcester, Massachusetts. In 1781 the title was changed to Thomas's Massachusetts Spy; or the Worcester Gazette with the motto "The noble Efforts of a Virtuous, Free and United People, shall extirpate Tyranny, and establish Liberty and Peace."  At the end of the war the motto was again changed to "Noscere res humanas est Hominis" ("knowledge of the world is necessary for every man").

Thomas continued publication of the paper until 1802, when he transferred control of his business concerns to his son.

In 1859 the paper was purchased by John Denison Baldwin, and later co-owned and edited by his sons, Captain John Stanton Baldwin and Charles Clinton Baldwin.

In 2011, faculty and students in the English Department at Worcester State University launched the New Worcester Spy, an on-line news and literary journal with the mission to "revive the great Worcester journalistic tradition of publishing brave stories that impart necessary, sometimes terrible, truths, for the edification of readers."

References

See also
History of American newspapers
(The New Worcester Spy 

Newspapers published in Boston
Defunct newspapers published in Massachusetts